In Islamic eschatology, the Mahdi is a Messianic figure who, it is believed, will appear on Earth before the Day of Judgment, and will rid the world of wrongdoing, injustice and tyranny. People claiming to be the Mahdi have appeared across the Muslim world – in South Asia, Africa and the Middle East – and throughout history since the birth of Islam (AD 610).

A claimant Mahdi can wield great temporal, as well as spiritual, power: claimant Mahdis have founded states (e.g. the late 19th-century Mahdiyah in Sudan), as well as religions and sects (e.g. Bábism, or the Ahmadiyya movement). The continued relevance of the Mahdi doctrine in the Muslim world was most recently emphasised during the 1979 seizing of the Grand Mosque in Mecca, Saudi Arabia, by at least 200 militants led by Juhayman al-Otaibi, who had declared his brother-in-law, Muhammad bin abd Allah al-Qahtani, the Mahdi.

Background
Traditionally interest in "apocalyptic speculation", (with  the appearance of the Mahdi being central), has been  strongest among mainstream Shia (Twelver Shia), Isma'ilism, and Sunni Muslims living on the "doctrinal and geographic margins" -- such as present day Morocco or Sudan -- but was weaker in the heartland of Sunni Islam.

While in (at least) Shi'i Islam, waiting for the Mahdi "is hailed as a form of worship; joining him when he appears and fighting under his banner to fill the world with justice is an everyday aspiration of the faithful", so that more pious Muslims are naturally attracted to support for someone convincingly claiming to be a Mahdi,  there is sometimes considerable clash between a claimant on the one hand, and orthodox believers and Islamic scholars on the other.  In Iraq claimants have been condemned as "infidels, charlatans and liars", while in Iraq one self-proclaimed mahdi (Dia Abdul Zahra Kadim) and one claiming the mahdi has appointed  him his  representative (wassi) (Ahmed Al-Hasan), both with militias, have both vigorously attacked Ayatollahs of Shi'i Islam.

Mahmoud Pargoo offers the explanation that according to Shīʿa hadiths, the mahdi "will bring a new religion, a new book and a new law"; making hard won Islamic learning and beloved, established religious rituals and institutions "redundant".

Ṣāliḥ ibn Tarīf 
Ṣāliḥ ibn Tarīf, the second leader of the Berghouata, proclaimed himself prophet of a new religion in the mid 8th century (second Islamic century). He appeared during the caliphate of the Umayyad Caliph Hisham. According to Ibn Khaldun's sources, he claimed receiving a new revelation from God called a Qur'an, written in the Berber language with 80 chapters. He established laws for his people, which called him Salih al-Mu'minin ('Restorer of the Believers'), and the final Mahdi.

Islamic literature considers his belief heretical, as several tenets of his teaching contrast with orthodox Islam, such as capital punishment for theft, unlimited divorces, fasting of the month of Rajab instead of Ramadan, and ten obligatory daily prayers instead of five. Politically, its motivation was presumably to establish their independence from the Umayyads, establishing an independent ideology lending legitimacy to the state. Some modern Berber activists regard him as a hero for his resistance to Arab conquest and his foundation of the Berghouata state.

Abdallah ibn Mu'awiya 
Abdallah ibn Mu'awiya was a descendant of Ja'far ibn Abi Talib. At the end of 127 AH / AD 744 Shias of Kufa set up him as Imam. He revolted against Yazid III, the Umayyad Caliph, with the support of Shias of Kufa and Ctesiphon. He moved to west of Iran and Isfahan and Istakhr. He managed to control the west of Iran for two years. Finally, he was defeated by the caliph armies in AD 746–7 and fled to Harat in Khurasan. He allegedly died imprisoned by Abu Muslim, his rival. His followers did not believe his death and said that he went to occultation and he would return as Mahdi.

Muhammad ibn Isma'il 
Muhammad ibn Isma'il (740 CE-813 CE), son of Isma'il ibn Ja'far (for whom Isma'ili sect of Islam was named), did not claim to be a Mahdi, and most Isma'ili believe the line of Imams continued through his son Ahmad al-Wafi (Abadullah ibn Muhammad), but after his death was revered by his followers as "the seventh and last imam ... whose return was awaited under the signs and powers customarily ascribed to the Mahdi."

Tenth century AD
In the tenth century the Isma'ili sect split into two -- the Salamiyids, headquartered in Salamiyah and led by Abdullah al-Mahdi Billah; and the Qarmatians, centred in al-Hasa (Eastern Arabia) -- each proclaiming a Mahdi. 
The Qarmatians broke away from the Salamiyah after 
Abdullah al-Mahdi Billah (Salamiyid leader) proclaiming himself mahdi. About 30 years later, Qarmatian leader Abu Tahir al-Jannabi, proclaimed his own  Mahdi, a "young prisoner", Abu'l-Fadl al-Isfahani.

Abdullah al-Mahdi Billah

In 899 CE, Abdullah al-Mahdi Billah (born Abdullah Sa'id) (r. 909–934), the head of the Isma'ili sect at the time, declared himself to be the Mahdi.  The first caliph of the Fatimid state, established in 909, was one of only two claimants who succeeded in establishing a state. (See Muhammad Ahmad below).
His authority as Mahdi was invoked to seize central Syria in 903, but were crushed by Iraqi troops. His preacher/Da'i Abu 'Abdullah Al-Husayn Al-Shi'i helped secure for him parts of north Africa using the support of the Berber locals some years later. The date of the apocalypse that was to follow the arrival of the Mahdi was "indefinitely postponed",  and Abdullah was unable to deploy any of the supernatural powers he (in theory) possessed as Mahdi -- those who insisted he use them were dismissed and sometimes put to death. 

The Fatimids eventually "abandoned millenarian rhetoric" completely and devoted themselves to empire building.  They built Cairo as capital in Egypt and their descendants continued to rule as Caliphs. The sixth caliph, Al-Hakim bi-Amr Allah, was known for "unpredictable commands" (destruction of churches, nocturnal ceasefires, liquidation of all dogs, prohibition of music) ) carried out with extreme violence -- and occasionally rescinded with equal suddenness".  His impulsiveness was believed by some to be divinely inspired and inspired the Druze religion, adherents of whom believe he is in occultation and due to return as Mahdi on Judgment Day.

The dynasty ended when Salah-ud-Din Ayubi (also called Saladin) took over Egypt and ended the Fatimid state. He imprisoned the last Fatimid Caliph and his family in the Fatimid Palace until death.

Abu'l-Fadl al-Isfahani 
Abu'l-Fadl al-Isfahani, also known as the Isfahani Mahdi, was a young Persian man who in 931 CE was declared to be "God incarnate" by Qarmatian leader of Bahrayn, Abu Tahir al-Jannabi. This new apocalyptic leader, however, caused great disruption by rejecting traditional aspects of Islam, and promoting ties to the old Persian religion of Zoroastrianism; "urging his followers" to denounce Abrahamic prophets and "celebrate fire" as Zoroastrians did. Abu Tahir disavowed him as an "imposter" and had him put to death.

Muhammad ibn al-Mustakfi

Muhammad ibn al-Mustakfi was the son and designated heir of the Abbasid caliph al-Mustakfi, he assumed the mantle of the Mahdi in a conspiracy to overthrow the Buyid Emirs and their puppet caliph, al-Muti.

Twelfth century AD

Hassan II of Alamut
In the late eleventh century, as the Fatimid dynasty relinquished any supranatural claims or interest in millenarianism, the Isma'ilis suffered another split. The head of the Fatimid army (Al-Afdal), sidelined the son designated heir (Abu Mansur Nizar) of the deceased caliph for a more compliant son-in-law. A revolt led by Nizar was crushed, but in Iran the commander of Isma'ili forces, Hasan-i-Sabba, broke from the Fatimids in Cairo and commenced a reign of terror against both leaders of the Sunni Abbasids and the Fatimid court in Cairo from his citadel in Alamut.

In the middle of Ramadan in 559 AH (1164 CE), a successor of Hasan-i-Sabba, Hassan II gathered his followers  and announced to "jinn, men and angels" that the Hidden Imam had freed them "from the burden of the rules of Holy Law". With that, the assembled took part in a ritual violation of Sharia, a banquet with wine, in violation of the Ramadan fast, with their backs turned towards Medina. Hassan II explained that he had abrogated the exoteric practice of Sharia and stressed on the esoteric (batini) side of the laws. And "while outwardly he was known as the grandson of Buzurgumid", in this esoteric reality,  Hasan claimed "he was the Imam of the time" (the last Imam of Shia Islam). Observance of Islamic rites was punishable by the utmost severity; Resistance was nonetheless deep, and Hasan was stabbed to death by his own brother-in-law. Islamic law was reintroduced after the death of his son.

Ibn Tumart 
In Sunni Morocco, Muhammad ibn Abdullah ibn Ibn Tumart (c. 1078/1080 – c. 1130), sought to reform Almoravid decadence in the early 12th century. Rejected in Marrakech and other cities, he turned to his Masmuda tribe in the Atlas Mountains for support. Because of their emphasis on the unity of God, his followers were known as Al Muwahhidun ('unitarians', in English; Almohads in the corrupted Spanish form). Ibn Tumart rejected all other Islamic legal schools, and saw in the lax morality of the ruling Almorvid dynasty signs of that The Hour of Judgement was nigh.

Although declared mahdi by his followers in 1121 CE, and calling himself imam and masum (literally in Arabic: innocent or free of sin), ibn Tumart consulted with a council of ten of his oldest disciples, and conform traditional Berber representative government, later added an assembly of fifty tribal leaders. The Almohad rebellion began in 1125 with attacks on Moroccan cities, including Sus and Marrakech.

His failure to capture Marrakech in 1130 "undermined his messianic pretentions to invulnerability", and  he died shortly after designated Abd al Mumin his successor with the title of Caliph.  Abd al Mumin claimed universal leadership in Islam - and placed members of his own family in power, converting the system into a traditional sultanate.

Fourteenth century AD

Shia in Iran and Iraq
With the Mongol invasion of the eastern Muslim world in the 13th century, many Muslims were killed, and Iran and Iraq came under Mongol control. By  the early 14th century Shi'a in Iran and Iraq began "clandestine dissidence". For example in Hilla, a center of Shi'i learning in central Iraq, each day from afternoon to evening prayer, 100 townsmen participated in a ritual appealing to the Mahdi to reappear. Drums were beaten, trumpets and bugles blown, a saddled horse for the Mahdi led to the sanctuary of the 'Master of the Hour' where the Shiʿa townsmen would cry: 'In the name of Allah, Master of the Hour, in the name of Allah, come, for disorder is rampant and iniquity rife! This is the moment for you to appear! Through you, Allah will make known the true [and separate] from the false!" Similar messianic events occurred in Iran. 
Fazlallah al-Astarbadi
After the Mongol khanate disintegrated after the death of Abu Sa'id Bahadur Khan in 1335, itinerant brotherhoods  propagated "popular spirituality", with the "foremost" group, the Shaykhiyya-Juryya,  announcing the imminent coming of the Mahdi and calling on Shia to prepare for his arrival by taking up arms. They were subdued by Timur from 1381-1392. Messianic agitation was taken up in 1386 by a dream interpreter by the name of Fazlallah al-Astarbadi who proclaimed himself the "manifestation of divine glory" and possessing the attributes of the "master of the Age", including the ability to discern hidden meanings of letters of the alphabet (hurūfiyya). He was executed in 1394, but his disciples "venerated him as a divine incarnation" and awaited his return under the signs of the "Master of the Sword". This sect was "hounded on all sides for heresy" in Iran and Syria, and gradually assimilated into the Sufi brotherhood of the Baktashis in Anatolia.

Fifteenth century AD

Nurbakhsh
A generation after the execution of Fazlallah al-Astarbadi in the early fifteenth century, Ishaq al-Khuttalani, a Sufi master of the Kubrawiyya order in what is now Tajikistan, proclaimed one of his followers, Nurbakhsh (the Gift of Light), the awaited Messiah (i.e. Mahdi). This movement "grew in size and influence", staged an unsuccessful revolt, whereupon Khuttalani and dozens of followers -- but not Nurbakhsh -- were executed in 1425. Nurbakhsh eventually established his own order in Kurdistan "but was forced to publicly renounce any claims to the imamate."

Muhammad Ibn Falah
Another example of how a "millenarian insurrection " gave rise "to a new dynastic power"  is Muhammad ibn Falah (1400-1465/66). He proclaimed himself the wali (friend) of the Mahdi circa 1415 CE. (The first Imam, Ali is regarded by Shiʿa as the wali of Allah.) By 1436 his following had grown in southwestern Iran and he now claimed to "the seventh imam's ultimate incarnation" and delivered "an address of the Mahdi". His sect became known as Musha'sha'iyyah. Opponents of his heresy arose in holy cities of Iraq, but his power was such that he destroyed the Hilla and Najaf, even desecrating Ali's tomb. He also established an emirate in Khurzestan passed on to his descendants, who became provincial governors after the emirate was conquered by the Safavids in 1508.

Syed Muḥammad Jaunpuri

Syed Muhammad Jaunpuri (9 September 1443 – 23 April 1505) was born in Jaunpur (modern-day Uttar Pradesh, North India). His father, Syed Muhammad Abdullah was a descendant of the seventh imam, Musa Kadhim.

He (Syed Muhammad Jaunpuri) claimed to be the Mahdi-e-Maoud on three occasions:
Between the rukn and maqam in front of the Kaaba in Masjid al-Haram (901 AH)
Taj Khan Salaar Mosque, Ahmedabad, Gujarat (903 AH)
Badli, Gujarat, where he attracted a large amount of followers but opposition from the ulema. (905 AH)

His five deputies were:
1) Bandagi Miyan Syed Mahmood also known as Sani-e-Mahdi, 
2) Bandagi Miyan Syed Khundameer also known as Siddiq-e-Vilayat, 
3) Bandagi Miyan Sha-e-Neymath also known as Miqraaz-e-Biddath, 
4) Bandagi Miyan Sha-e-Nizam also known as Dariya-e-Wahdath-o-Ashaam, 
5) Bandagi Miyan Sha-e-Dilawar also known as Maqbool-e-Mahdi.

Syed Muhammad Jaunpuri died in 1505 AD, aged 63, at Farah, Afghanistan. His followers, known as Mahdavis, continue to exist and are centred around the Indian city of Hyderabad, although there are Mahdavi communities in other parts of the world migrated from Hyderabad India Gujarat, Karnataka, Madhya Pradesh and Maharashtra, as well as in Pakistan and overseas in the United States, Canada, Australia, United Arab Emirates, Qatar, Saudi Arabia, Kuwait, Africa and the United Kingdom.

Sheikh Bedreddin
Sheikh Bedreddin (1359–1420), full name Sheikh Bedreddin Mahmud Bin Israel Bin Abdulaziz, was an influential mystic, scholar, theologian, and revolutionary. He is best known for his role in a 1416 revolt against the Ottoman Empire, in which he and his disciples posed a serious challenge to the authority of Sultan Mehmed I and the Ottoman state.

Sixteenth century AD
In 1509, the Banū Saʿdid, a family claiming ancestry from Muhammad and aided with the military support of the Shaziliyya, "the most powerful brotherhood in the region", took control of Sous. It leader, born Muhammad al-Mahdi, was proclaimed sovereign, and his followers "saw in him the realization" of a famous hadith stating that "a descendant of the Prophet, bearing the same name, Muhammad, will come to restore justice on earth." The dynasty of Banū Saʿdid went on with the help of firearms to rule Morocco for most of the following century.

Ahmed ibn Abi Mahalli
Unsuccessfully challenging the Saʿdid dynasty was another figure making use of Mahdi title, Ahmed ibn Abi Mahalli; n (1559-1613). A Moroccan Imam and the Sufi leader, who  proclaimed himself Mahdi in 1610 after denouncing his Sufi master as an innovator and reviling the ruling  Sa'did dynasty for alleged religious laxness and failure to attack Western colonialists. He was took the city of  Marrakesh in the south of Morocco, but after he was killed in combat in 1613 his followers saw "their faith in his invincibility disproven" and fled.  His head  was severed and hung from the city ramparts until it disintegrated, but despite this graphic evidence "part of the population" in the region refused to accept his death and believed that he "had hidden himself from public view."

Shah Ismail I Safavid
Nurbakhsh influence was felt in the Safavid dynasty (1501-1736). The dynasty was named after a Sufi order (Safaviyya) that converted to Shiʿism in the fifteenth century, (although the dynasty was "probably of Kurdish origin"). The Safavids depended for military power on "fanatical Turkmen tribes", known as "Qizilbash", who were accused of paganism and shamanism and even ritual cannibalism. After its leader (Haydar) died in combat, he was succeeded by his twelve year old son Ismail I.
"Strongly influenced" by one of Nurbakhsh's disciples, Ismail used eschatology to justify the savagery of Qizilbash, claiming he was the Mahdi. The ferocious Qizilbash took successively Baku, Tabriz, Isfahan, Shiraz, Baghdad, but were routed in 1514 by the Ottoman artillery. "Unable any longer to pose as the Mahdi, he now claimed to be an ambassador of the Hidden Imam. The Anatolian origins of the Safavid family were conveniently forgotten and replaced by a prophetic ancestry that allowed the dynasty to represent itself as the instrument of the twelfth imam during the course of the Great Occultation. A minority of the Qizilbash nonetheless continued to consider the shah to be the Mahdi himself." 
This heresy was suppressed by Ismail's son and successor.

Seventeenth century

Ahmad al-Mansur
Ahmad al-Mansur (1578–1603), sultan of Morocco. The jurist Ahmad bin Muhammad bin al-Siddeeq wrote a treatise exclusively on the Mahdi, presenting a hundred arguments in support of the Mahdism of al-Mansur.

Ahmed ibn Abi Mahalli
Ahmed ibn Abi Mahalli (1559–1613), from the south of Morocco, was a Qadi and religious scholar who proclaimed himself mahdi and led a revolution (1610–13) against the reigning Saadi dynasty.

Eighteenth century

Āghā Muḥammad Rezā
Agha Muhammad Reza, a Shia Muslim of Iranian ancestry living in the Sylhet region of Bengal rose to prominence as a Sufi pir. He gained a large following of thousands and started a movement in 1799 by invading the Kachari Kingdom and claiming independence from the British. Declaring himself the Mahdi, he was defeated after a number of battles against the East India Company. He escaped but was later caught and sent for lifetime imprisonment in Calcutta.

Nineteenth century
The 19th century provided several Mahdi claimants, some of whose followers and teachings survive to the present day.

Bu Ziyan
One Mahdi who did not aim to reinvent Islam but to uphold it against kafir invaders, was Bu Ziyan. In 1849, Muhammad appeared to him in a series of dreams, commanding him "three times" to "assume the duties of the Mahdi" and drive the French colonialists from Algeria. Bu Ziyan had served as representative of the Anti-French leader Abd al-Qadir, but now led an uprising with the help of many members of the strongest Sufi brotherhood, Rahmaniyya. The French besieged their headquarters at the oasis of Zaʿatsha for 52 days, breaking through and annihilated the population. Bu Ziyan's head was mounted on a pike at the village entrance, but "word spread through the Sahara that the Mahdi -- or at least one of his sons had escaped alive."

Alí Muḥammad Shírází (Báb)

Alí Muḥammad Shírází (20 October 1819 – 9 July 1850), claimed to be the Mahdi on 23 May 1844, taking the name Báb ( / ) and thereby founding the religion of Bábism. He was later executed by firing squad in the town of Tabriz. His remains are currently kept in a tomb at the Baháʼí World Centre in Haifa, Israel. The Báb is considered a central figure of the Baháʼí Faith.

Muḥammad Aḥmad
Muhammad Ahmad or Muhammad Ahmad bin Abd Allah (12 August 1844 – 22 June 1885), was a Sudanese Sufi sheikh of the Samaniyya order. Expelled for puritanical outbursts of anger, he founded his own order amidst Sudanese popular protest  and millenarian unrest over Anglo-Egyptian rule. In June 1881 he declared himself Mahdi, announcing he had dreamt that he had been enthroned by Muhammad. He established control over the province of Kordofan and went on to lead a successful military campaign against the Turko-Egyptian government of Sudan, defeating the Anglo-Egyptian army and capturing the Sudanese capital, Khartoum in 1885. He predicted he would soon say prayers in Mecca, Medina, Cairo, and Jerusalem, but died a few months after his victory. The Mahdist state continued under his successor, Abdallahi ibn Muhammad, until 1898, when it fell to the British army following the Battle of Omdurman.

Mīrzā Ghulām Aḥmad

Mirza Ghulam Ahmad (13 February 1835 – 26 May 1908), claimed to be both the Mahdi and the second coming of Jesus in the late 19th century in British India. He founded the Ahmadiyya religious movement in 1889, which, although considered by its followers to be Islam, is not recognized as such by the majority of mainstream Muslims. In 1880, Ahmad claimed to be the Mahdi in his book Braheen-e-Ahmadiyya, where he claimed to have received revelations. In 1974, the Pakistani parliament adopted a law declaring the Ahmadis to be Not-Muslims. Since Ghulam Ahmad's death, the Ahmadiyya community has been led by his successors and the number of Ahmadi has grown considerably.

Wallace Fard Muhammad
Wallace D. Fard Muhammad (26 February 1877? - 1934?) founded the Nation of Islam, an Islamic religious movement, in Detroit, United States on 4 July 1930. The Nation of Islam teaches that W. Fard Muhammad was both the "Messiah" of Judaism and the Mahdi of Islam.

Twentieth century

Muḥammad bin abd Allah al-Qahtani

Muhammad bin abd Allah al-Qahtani (28 September 1935 – 9 January 1980), was proclaimed Mahdi by his brother-in-law, Juhayman al-Otaibi, who led over 200 militants to seize the Grand Mosque in Mecca on 20 November 1979. The uprising was suppressed after a two-week siege in which at least 300 people were killed.

Riaz Aḥmed Gohar Shahi

Riaz Ahmed Gohar Shahi (born 25 November 1941) is the founder of the spiritual movements Messiah Foundation International (MFI) and Anjuman Serfaroshan-e-Islam. He is controversial for being declared the Mehdi, Messiah, and Kalki Avatar by the MFI.

Shahi's supporters claim that his face became prominent on the Moon, Sun, nebula star and the Black Stone in Mecca, and that these appearances were signs from God that Gohar Shahi was the awaited Imam Mehdi, Messiah, and Kalki Avatar in 1985. Shahi has also supported this claim, saying that God had revealed the images of Shahi on the Moon and various locations, for which Shahi himself was not responsible, and if questions should be raised, they should be raised with God.

Messiah Foundation International claims the alleged images to be signs from God, pointing to Shahi being the awaited Mehdi, and quote religious texts. His whereabouts are unknown: a Pakistani news agency says he died in 2003 and some say he is serving a lifetime prison in Pakistan, while others say he is in the United Kingdom.

Ariffin Moḥamed

Ariffin Mohammed (born 1943), also known as "Ayah Pin", the leader and founder of the banned Sky Kingdom, he was born in 1943 in Beris, Kampung Besar Bachok, Kelantan. In 1975 a spiritual group was formed in Bagan Lebai Tahir, Butterworth, Penang. He claimed to be the incarnation of Jesus, as well as Muhammad, Shiva, and Buddha. Devotees of Sky Kingdom believe that one day, Ayah Pin will return as the Mahdi. His followers consider him the king of the sky, and the supreme object of devotion for all religions.

Shukri Mustafa

Shukri Mustafa was the leader of Takfir wal-Hijra, also known as Jama'at al-Muslimin, who was executed in 1978.

Mouhammadou Limamou leye

The Layene (also spelled Layène, Layenne, or Layeen) is a religious brotherhood of Sufi Muslims based in Senegal and founded in 1884 by Seydina Limamou Laye (1844-1909), who was born Libasse Thiaw. It is notable for its belief that their founder was the Mahdi (the reincarnation of Muhammad), and that his son, Seydina Issa Rouhou Laye, was the reincarnation of Jesus.

Twenty-first century

Dia Abdul Zahra Kadim
"In 2006, Dia Abdul Zahra Kadim, announced he was the awaited Mahdi and organized an armed group called “the Soldiers of Heaven". According to official reports, in late January 2007, Kadim marched towards  the Shiite holy city of Najaf planned to execute the Shiite authorities and Grand Ayatollahs there and "take over their hawzas." Alerted to this menace, Iraqi forces surrounded Kadim and killed him, and "263 terrorists" in the 2007 Battle of Najaf. Unofficially, Iraqi and American forces are accused of wiping out the entire community of the Soldiers of Heaven, including women and children, at a "camp in Zarga, north of Najaf",

Mohammed Abdullah al-Nasr
In 2016, Mohammed Abdullah al-Nasr, a Sunni Egyptian television preacher known as Sheikh Mizo, declared on his Facebook page that he is the Mahdi, quoting the Prophet Muhammad and calling both Sunnis and Shiites to comply with his ruling.

Other cases
According to seminary expert, Mehdi Ghafari, more than 3,000 Mahdi claimants were in prison in Iran in 2012.

People claiming to be representatives of the Mahdi
According to at least Shi'i beliefs, before the hidden imam/mahdi himself appears,  "a messenger that represents him and serves as an intermediary between him and the people" will appear, conveying his commands and carrying out some of his tasks.

Haidar Machtat al-Munchidawi, an Iraqi man nicknamed al-Qahtani, wears a turban and describes himself as "the mediator of the Mahdi"; his followers opened a Facebook page entitled, “Fully Dedicated Youth”;  In 2015, according to Al Monitor, the chaos in Iraq was leading to the emergence of a growing number of people claiming to be either "the Shiites’ awaited Imam Mahdi or his messenger". Adnan Abu Zeed describes  though some contend it is intended to eliminate the Shiite religious authorities
Fadel al-Marsoumi, a self-described “the divine preacher”  sent by God to unify all sects in a single group; also has a Facebook page.
Ahmad al-Hassan, an engineer from Basra and leader of the Shia Iraqi movement Ansar of Imam al-Mahdi declared in 1998  that the Hidden Iman had designated him as his (the Hidden Imam's) representative (wassi). He has  denounced the errancy of religious seminaries in Najaf, and established a militia dubbed the Supporters of the Iman Mahdi (Ansar al-Imam al-Mahdi).

Although a native of Iraq, he calls himself, (and his followers believe him to be), al-Yamani, the eschatological leader from Yemen who will precede the return of the Imam, although this is not a mainstream belief in Shia Islam. Following the American invasion of Iraq, he called for a defensive Jihad against "the American Satan", and threatened all those who resisted him with being put to the sword or dying "in the shadow of the sword". In addition he has called on Iranian Supreme Leader Ali Khamenei and "all other" Muslim leaders to "yield their power to him", and "excoriated" all leading Shi'a who deny that "the end of Great Occultation is at hand".

People claimed to be the Mahdi by their followers or supporters
 Adnan Oktar
 Al-Hakim bi-Amr Allah
 Fethullah Gülen
 Ja'far al-Sadiq (according to the Tawussite Shia)
 Master Fard Muhammad (according to the Nation of Islam)
 Muhammad Bayazeed Khan Panni (according to the Hezbut Tawheed)
 Muhammad ibn Abdullah al-Aftah ibn Ja'far al-Sadiq
 Muhammad ibn Abdallah An-Nafs Az-Zakiyya
 Muhammad ibn Ali al-Hadi
 Muhammad ibn Qasim (al-Alawi)
 Musa al-Kadhim (according to the Waqifite Shia)
 Yahya ibn Umar

See also
 False messiah
 Messiah
 Messiah complex
 Jewish Messiah claimants
 List of people who have claimed to be Jesus
 List of messiah claimants
 List of avatar claimants
 List of Buddha claimants
 Second Coming of Christ
 Unfulfilled Christian religious predictions
 List of founders of religious traditions
 List of people who have been considered deities
 Signs of the reappearance of Muhammad al-Mahdi
 Reappearance of Muhammad al-Mahdi
 Mahdism

References

External sources
 
 Yohanan Friedmann, "Prophecy Continuous - Aspects of Ahmadi Religious Thought and Its Medieval Background"; Oxford University Press (2003) 
 Timothy Furnish, "Holiest Wars: Islamic Mahdis, their Jihads and Osama bin Laden" (Greenwood, 2005)
 Peter Smith, the Bábí and Baháʼí Religions - from messianic Shi'ism to a world religion; Cambridge University Press (1987); 
 Abbas Amanat, Resurrection and Renewal - the Making of the Bábí Movement in Iran 1844–1850; Cornell University Press (1989); 
 

Islamic eschatology
Lists of Muslims
Self-declared mahdi
Mahdism